Aaptudu is a 2004 Indian Telugu-language action film directed by Muthyala Subbaiah starring Rajasekhar and Anjala Zhaveri. The film is a remake of Ghaatak (1996).

Cast 

Rajasekhar as Bose
Anjala Zhaveri
Mukesh Rishi as Gangi Reddy
Satyanarayana as Sivaramakrishnayya
Sunil as an auto driver
Chandramohan as Chandram
Chalapathi Rao as a resident
Krishna Bhagavan as a resident
Rallapalli as a resident
Kondavalasa
Sana
Omkar
 Abhinayashree
 Anant
A. V. S.
 Suman (guest appearance)
 Eeswari Rao (guest appearance)

Production 
This film marks the return of Anjala Zaveri to Telugu films following a brief hiatus. Rajasekhar produced the film. The film was shot in April of 2004. Mukesh Rishi was cast in a negative role. Suman and Eeswari Rao were cast in guest roles.

Soundtrack 
The songs were composed by Ramana Gogula. The Hindu gave a mixed review for the songs. "Toofanai" based on  Babooji Jara Dheere Chalo from Dum (2003). "Pedala Paina" is based on a song from Humraaz (1967).
"Anadiga" - Sriram Pardasaradhi and Nandita 
"Palle Palleku" - Shankar Mahadevan
"Pedala Paina" - Tippu, Nandhita
"Manasulo" - Udit Narayan, Ganga
"Thufanai" - Malathi
"Aakhari Narasimham" - S. P. Balasubrahmanyam

Release and reception 
The film was released on 23 October 2004, coinciding with Vijayadashami.

A critic from The Hindu opined that "VETERAN DIRECTOR, Muthyala Subbaiah, turns out a reasonably good formula story". Jeevi of Idlebrain.com gave the film a rating of two-and-a-half out of five and said that "The plus point of the film is hero Raja Sekhar. Minus points is inept handling by Muthyala Subbayya for an action film". A critic from Full Hyderabad criticized the film as a whole.

References

External links

Indian action films

Telugu remakes of Hindi films